Malda Division is an administrative division within the Indian state of West Bengal. This division build on 22 Nov 2016.This division was earlier a part of Jalpaiguri division and was carved out from it in 2016. The headquarters and the largest city of the Malda Division is Malda. The office of divisional commissioner is temporary located in old circuit house at B. G. Road, Malda.

Districts

It consists of 4 districts:

Demographics

Malda division is the only division of West Bengal where Muslims forms the majority of the population. Muslims numbering 
9,612,405, comprises 60.94% of the population, whereas Hindus numbering 6,025,498, forms 38.20% of the division's population.

See also
 Administrative divisions of West Bengal

References

Divisions of West Bengal
Northern Bengal